Guzhiry (Khujar) is a rural locality (a selo) in Tunkinsky District, Republic of Buryatia, Russia. The population was 159 as of 2010. There are 2 streets.

Geography 
Guzhiry is located 76 km east of Kyren (the district's administrative centre) by road. Dalakhay is the nearest rural locality.

References 

Rural localities in Tunkinsky District